Cheilosia shannoni is a species of syrphid fly in the family Syrphidae.

References

Eristalinae
Diptera of North America
Hoverflies of North America

Articles created by Qbugbot
Insects described in 1923
Taxa named by Raymond Corbett Shannon